Red Saunders may refer to:
 Red Saunders (musician) (1912–1981), American jazz drummer and bandleader
 Red Saunders (photographer) (born 1945), British photographer and a founder of Rock Against Racism

See also 
 Pterocarpus santalinus, common name red saunders